Leggadina is a genus of rodents from Australia.

Species
Genus Leggadina
Forrest's mouse, Leggadina forresti Thomas, 1906
Lakeland Downs mouse, Leggadina lakedownensis Watts, 1976

References

 
Rodent genera
Taxa named by Oldfield Thomas